Olga Volkova  (born 2 July 1982) is a Russian retired ice hockey player. She represented  in the women's ice hockey tournament at the 2002 Winter Olympics, at the IIHF Women's World Championships in 1999, 2000, 2004, and 2005, and won bronze at the 2001 IIHF Women's World Championship.

References

External links
 

1982 births
Living people
Sportspeople from Krasnoyarsk
Russian women's ice hockey defencemen
Olympic ice hockey players of Russia
Ice hockey players at the 2002 Winter Olympics